The All Airlines Gold Cup was a domestic football tournament organised by the Indian Football Association. It was launched in 1986 and Mohammedan Sporting Club won the inaugural edition beating Mohun Bagan A.C. 3-2.  All Airlines Gold Cup was introduced by the All Airlines Recreation Club.

The 2012 All Airlines Gold Cup was won by Mohun Bagan A.C.

Results

Top three winners

References

External links
 Indianfootball.de
 Indianfootballnetwork.com
 Deccanchronicle.com 
 Kolkatafootball.com
 Tatafootballacademy.com

Football cup competitions in India
Football in West Bengal
Football competitions in Kolkata
1986 establishments in India
2012 disestablishments in India
Defunct football competitions in India